The men's marathon at the 2013 IPC Athletics World Championships was held in the streets of Lyon, France, on 29 July.

Medalists

See also
List of IPC world records in athletics

References

Marathon
Marathons at the World Para Athletics Championships
IPC World Championships